Iris macrosiphon, the bowltube iris, is a flowering plant in the iris family, endemic to California in the Cascade Range Foothills, north and central Sierra Nevada Foothills, Inner North Coast Ranges, and San Francisco Bay Area, where it occurs in sunny grasslands, meadows, and open woodlands.

The leaves are very slender, 2.5–5 mm wide, and blue-green in color. The flower is variable, golden yellow to cream or pale lavender to deep blue-purple, generally with darker veins. The flower stems are usually short (less than 25 cm) when in the sun and bear 2 flowers. It blooms in spring.

Uses
Used as a source of fiber by  Native Americans.  The fiber was used for fish nets, deer snares and other items.

It is also cultivated as an ornamental plant, where it prefers dry summer dormancy, with good drainage.

References

Jepson Flora Project: Iris macrosiphon
ITIS 43220
Flora of North America:
USDA: Plants Profile:
Images from the CalPhotos archive:
Harlow, Nora, Jakob, Kristin, and Raiche, Roger (2003) Wild Lilies, Irises, and Grasses. University of California Press. 
Fiber uses of Iris macrosiphon

macrosiphon
Endemic flora of California
Natural history of the California chaparral and woodlands
Flora of the Sierra Nevada (United States)
Natural history of the California Coast Ranges
Natural history of the San Francisco Bay Area
Taxa named by John Torrey
Fiber plants
Garden plants of North America
Flora without expected TNC conservation status